Johann Olearius may refer to:

Johann Olearius (1611–1684) a German hymnwriter, preacher, and academic.
Johann Gottfried Olearius (1635–1711) a German preacher and horticulturalist
Johann Christoph Olearius (1668–1747) deacon of the Bach Church, Arnstadt